Anna Nikitichna Mikhalkova (Russian: А́нна Ники́тична Михалко́ва;  born 14 May 1974, in Moscow) is a Russian actress and model.

Her film credits include Our Own, Kokoko and Rasputin.  Her television credits include Zhizn i sudba and Burnt by the Sun 2. Since 2002, she presents children's television program Spokoynoy nochi, malyshi!.

She is the eldest daughter of Nikita Mikhalkov.

Selected filmography

Film
 Anna: 6 - 18 (Анна: от 6 до 18, 1993) as  herself 
 The Barber of Siberia (Сибирский цирюльник, 1998) as  Dunyasha
 Our Own (Свои, 2004) as  Katerina 
 Dark Planet (Обитаемый остров, 2008) as  Ordi Tader 
 Burnt by the Sun 2 (Утомлённые солнцем 2: Цитадель, 2010) as  Nura the woman in labor 
 Raspoutine (Распутин, 2011) as  Anna Vyrubova
 The PyraMMMid (ПираМММида, 2011) as  Mamontov's wife 
 My Dad Baryshnikov (Мой папа Барышников, 2011)
 Love with an Accent (Любовь с акцентом, 2012)
 Selfie (Селфи, 2018) as Vika
 Story of One Appointment (История одного назначения, 2018) as Anna Ivanovna
 Another Woman  (Давай разведёмся, 2019) as Masha
 House Arrest (2021)
 No Looking Back (2021)
 Nika (2022)

TV
 Good Night, Little Ones! (Спокойной ночи, малыши!, 2002-present) as herself (host) 
 Heavenly Court (Небесный суд, 2011, 2014) as  Lucia Arkadievna 
 Doctor Richter (Доктор Рихтер, 2017) as  Elizaveta Nikolskaya 
 An Ordinary Woman (Обычная женщина, 2018) as  Marina Lavrova

References

External links

Russian film actresses
Living people
1974 births
Russian television presenters
Russian child actresses
Soviet child actresses
Recipients of the Nika Award
Gerasimov Institute of Cinematography alumni
Academicians of the National Academy of Motion Picture Arts and Sciences of Russia
Actresses from Moscow
Russian women television presenters
20th-century Russian actresses
21st-century Russian actresses
Mikhalkov family